The 1856 United States elections elected the members of the 35th United States Congress and the President to serve from 1857 until 1861. The elections took place during a major national debate over slavery, with the issue of "Bleeding Kansas" taking center stage. Along with the 1854 elections, these elections occurred during the transitional period immediately preceding the Third Party System. Old party lines were broken; new party alignments along sectional lines were in the process of formation. The Republican Party absorbed the Northern anti-slavery representatives who had been elected in 1854 under the "Opposition Party" ticket (consisting largely of former Whigs) as the second-most powerful party in Congress. Minnesota and Oregon joined the union before the next election, and elected their respective Congressional delegations to the 35th Congress.

In the Presidential election, Democratic former Secretary of State James Buchanan defeated Republican General John Fremont and the American Party candidate, former President Millard Fillmore. Buchanan swept the South and split the North with Fremont, while Fillmore won Maryland. Buchanan had defeated incumbent President Franklin Pierce (the first elected president to lose his party's presidential nomination) and Senator Stephen A. Douglas of Illinois on the 17th ballot at the 1856 Democratic National Convention. Fremont defeated Supreme Court Justice John McLean at the 1856 Republican National Convention to take the Republican nomination. Fillmore's third-party candidacy took over twenty percent of the popular vote, the best popular vote showing by a third party until Theodore Roosevelt's 1912 candidacy.

In the House, the Democratic Party won several seats to take the plurality, but narrowly missed taking the majority. The Republican Party established itself as the second-largest party in the House, replacing the Opposition Party. The American Party lost numerous seats, but continued to maintain a presence in the House. Democrat James Lawrence Orr won election as Speaker of the House.

In the Senate, Democrats made minor gains, maintaining their commanding majority. The Republican Party replaced the Opposition Party as the second-largest party, while the American Party picked up a small number of seats.

See also
1856 United States presidential election
1856–57 United States House of Representatives elections
1856–57 United States Senate elections

References

 
1856